Maximus Air, an Abu Dhabi Aviation Group company was established in 2005 to move outsized cargo. After operating for 5 years in the region, it is now a regional air cargo carrier and cargo aircraft wet-lease operator (ACMI), employing more than 200 staff. It operates a fleet of eight all-cargo Antonov An-124-100, Ilyushin IL-76TD and Airbus A300-600RP2F aircraft across the Middle East, Europe, Africa and Asia.

Maximus formerly ran regular scheduled cargo services on behalf of Etihad Cargo and is the appointed exclusive air relief support partner of the UAE Red Crescent.

History
The airline was established in 2005 and has 245+ employees (at January 2012).

Expansion
The conversion of a new Airbus A300-600 regional freighter, purchased by Maximus Air at the start of 2011, and part of a Dhs350m expansion programme, is on schedule for its mid-summer entry into the company's fleet. The aircraft, offering a maximum structural payload up to 46 tonnes of payload capacity, is one of three purchased from Japan Airlines (JAL) and has been at the Dresden, Germany plant of EADS EFW.

Fleet
The Maximus Air fleet consists of the following aircraft

References

External links

 
 Maximus Air Fleet on ch-aviation.ch

Airlines of the United Arab Emirates
Cargo airlines of the United Arab Emirates
Airlines established in 2005
Emirati companies established in 2005